Bilverdi (also Romanized as Bīlverdī; also known as Beloo Yerdi, Belvīrdī, Bilberdi, Bīlehverdī, Bil’verdy, and Bīlvīrdī) is a village in Bedevostan-e Gharbi Rural District, Khvajeh District, Heris County, East Azerbaijan Province, Iran.

population
At the 2006 census, its population was 1,147, in 288 families.

References 

Populated places in Heris County